The Shailendra dynasty (derived from Sanskrit combined words Śaila and Indra, meaning "King of the Mountain", also spelled Sailendra, Syailendra or Selendra) was the name of a notable Indianised dynasty that emerged in 8th-century Java, whose reign signified a cultural renaissance in the region. The Shailendras were active promoters of Mahayana Buddhism with the glimpses of Hinduism, and covered the Kedu Plain of Central Java with Buddhist monuments, one of which is the colossal stupa of Borobudur, now a UNESCO World Heritage Site.

The Shailendras are considered to have been a thalassocracy and ruled vast swathes of maritime Southeast Asia, however they also relied on agricultural pursuits, by way of intensive rice cultivation on the Kedu Plain of Central Java. The dynasty appeared to be the ruling family of both the Mataram Kingdom of Central Java, for some period, and the Srivijaya Kingdom in Sumatra.

The inscriptions created by Shailendras use three languages; Old Malay, Old Javanese, and Sanskrit — written either in the Kawi alphabet, or pre-Nāgarī script. The use of Old Malay has sparked speculation of a Sumatran origin, or Srivijayan connection of this family. On the other hand, the use of Old Javanese suggests their firm political establishment on Java. The use of Sanskrit usually indicates the official nature, and/or religious significance, of the event described in any given inscription.

Primary sources 

The Sojomerto inscription (c. 725) discovered in Batang Regency, Central Java, mentioned the name Dapunta Selendra and Selendranamah. The name 'Selendra' was another spelling of Shailendra, suggested that Dapunta Selendra was the progenitor of Shailendra family in Central Java. The inscription is Shaivist in nature, which suggests that the family was probably initially Hindu Shaivist before converting to Mahayana Buddhism.

The name also appears in several other inscriptions like the Kelurak inscription (782) and the Karangtengah inscription (824). Outside Indonesia, the name Shailendra is to be found in the Ligor inscription (775) on the Malay peninsula and Nalanda inscription (860) in India. It is possible that it was Paṇaṃkaraṇa that create the Chaiya, or Ligor inscription (775), and took control over Srivijayan realm in the Southern Thailand Malay Peninsula.

Possible origins

Although the rise of the Shailendras occurred in Kedu Plain in the Javanese heartland, their origin has been the subject of discussion. Apart from Java itself, an earlier homeland in Sumatra, India or Cambodia has been suggested. The latest studies apparently favour a native origin of the dynasty. Despite their connections with Srivijaya in Sumatra and Thai-Malay Peninsula, the Shailendras were more likely of Javanese origin.

Odisha (Kalinga)
According to Ramesh Chandra Majumdar, an Indian scholar, the Shailendra dynasty that established itself in the Indonesian archipelago originated from Kalinga (modern Odisha) in Eastern India. This opinion is also shared by Nilakanta Sastri and J. L. Moens. Moens further describes that the Shailendras originated in India and established themselves in Palembang before the arrival of Srivijaya's Dapunta Hyang Sri Jayanasa. In 683, the Shailendras moved to Java because of the pressure exerted by Dapunta Hyang and his troops.

Sumatra
Other scholars hold that the expansion of Buddhist kingdom of Srivijaya was involved in the rise of the dynasty in Java. Supporters of this connection emphasize the shared Mahayana patronage; the intermarriages and the Ligor inscription. Also the fact that some of Shailendra's inscriptions were written in old Malay, which suggested Srivijaya or Sumatran connections. The name 'Selendra' was first mentioned in Sojomerto inscription (725) as "Dapunta Selendra". Dapunta Selendra is suggested as the ancestor of Shailendras. The title Dapunta is similar to those of Srivijayan King Dapunta Hyang Sri Jayanasa, and the inscription — although discovered in Central Java north coast — was written in old Malay, which suggested the Sumatran origin or Srivijayan connection to this family.

Java

Another theory suggests that Shailendra was a native Javanese dynasty and the Sanjaya dynasty was actually a branch of the Shailendras since Sri Sanjaya and his offspring belong to the Shailendra family that were initially the Shaivist rulers of the Mataram Kingdom. The association of Shailendra with Mahayana Buddhism began after the conversion of Panaraban or Panangkaran to Buddhism. This theory is based on the Carita Parahyangan, which tells of the ailing King Sanjaya ordering his son, Rakai Panaraban or Panangkaran, to convert to Buddhism because their faith in Shiva was feared by the people in favor of the pacifist Buddhist faith. The conversion of Panangkaran to Buddhism also corresponds to the Raja Sankhara inscription, which tells of a king named Sankhara (identified as Panangkaran) converting to Buddhism because his Shaiva faith was feared by the people. Unfortunately, the Raja Sankhara inscription is now missing.

Discounted proposal
In 1934, the French scholar Coedes proposed a relation with the Funan kingdom in Cambodia. Coedes believed that the Funanese rulers used similar-sounding 'mountainlord' titles, but several Cambodia specialists have discounted this. They  hold there is no historical evidence for such titles in the Funan period.

Shailendras in Java 

The Shailendra rulers maintained cordial relations, including marriage alliances with Srivijaya in Sumatra. For instance, Samaragrawira married Dewi Tara, a daughter of Srivijayan Maharaja Dharmasetu. The mutual alliance between the two kingdoms ensured that Srivijaya had no need to fear the emergence of a Javanese rival and that the Shailendra had access to the international market.

Karangtengah inscription dated 824 mentioned about king Samaratungga. His daughter named Pramodhawardhani has inaugurated a Jinalaya, a sacred buddhist sanctuary. The inscription also mentioned a sacred Buddhist building called Venuvana to place the cremated ashes of King Indra. The Tri Tepusan inscription dated 842 mentioned about the sima (tax free) lands awarded by Śrī Kahulunan (Pramodhawardhani, daughter of Samaratungga) to ensure the funding and maintenance of a Kamūlān called Bhūmisambhāra. Kamūlān itself from the word mula which means 'the place of origin', a sacred building to honor the ancestors. These findings suggested that either the ancestors of the Shailendras were originated from Central Java, or as the sign that Shailendra have established their holds on Java. Casparis suggested that Bhūmi Sambhāra Bhudhāra which in Sanskrit means "The mountain of combined virtues of the ten stages of Boddhisattvahood", was the original name of Borobudur.

The received older version holds that the Shailendra dynasty existed next to the Sanjaya dynasty in Java. Much of the period was characterized by peaceful co-existence and cooperation but towards the middle of the 9th century relations had deteriorated. Around 852 the Sanjaya ruler Pikatan had defeated Balaputra, the offspring of the Shailendra monarch Samaratunga and princess Tara. This ended the Shailendra presence in Java and Balaputra retreated to the Srivijaya kingdom in Sumatra, where he became the paramount ruler.

Earlier historians, such as N.J. Krom and Coedes, tend to equate Samaragrawira and Samaratungga as the same person. However, later historians such as Slamet Muljana equate Samaratungga with Rakai Garung, mentioned in Mantyasih inscription as fifth monarch of Mataram Kingdom. Which means Samaratungga was the successor of Samaragrawira, and Balaputradewa that is also Samaragrawira's son, is Samaratungga's younger brother and ruled in Suvarnadvipa (Sumatra), and he is not Samaratungga's son. This version holds Balaputra that reign in Sumatra challenged the Pikatan-Pramodhawardhani legitimation in Java, arguing that his niece and her husband has less rights to rule Java compared to his.

In 851 an Arabic merchant named Sulaiman recorded an event about Javanese Sailendras staging a surprise attack on the Khmers by approaching the capital from the river, after a sea crossing from Java. The young king of Khmer was later punished by the Maharaja, and subsequently the kingdom became a vassal of Sailendra dynasty. In 916 CE, a Javanese kingdom invaded Khmer Empire, using 1000 "medium-sized" vessels, which results in Javanese victory. The head of Khmer's king then brought to Java.

Shailendras in Sumatra

After 824, there are no more references to the Shailendra house in the Javanese epigraphic record. Around 860 the name re-appears in the Nalanda inscription in India. According to the text, the king Devapaladeva of Bengala (Pala Empire) had granted 'Balaputra, the king of Suvarna-dvipa' (Sumatra) the revenues of 5 villages to a Buddhist monastery near Bodh Gaya. Balaputra was styled a descendant from the Shailendra dynasty and grandson of the king of Java.

From Sumatra, the Shailendras also maintained overseas relations with the Chola kingdom in Southern India, as shown by several south Indian inscriptions. An 11th-century inscription mentioned the grant of revenues to a local Buddhist sanctuary, built in 1005 by the king of the Srivijaya. In spite the relations were initially fairly cordial, hostilities had broken out in 1025. Rajendra Chola I the Emperor of the Chola dynasty conquered some territories of the Shailendra Dynasty in the 11th century. The devastation caused by Chola invasion of Srivijaya in 1025, marked the end of Shailendra family as the ruling dynasty in Sumatra. The last king of Shailendra dynasty — the Maharaja Sangrama Vijayatunggavarman — was imprisoned and taken as hostage. Nevertheless, amity was re-established between the two states, before the end of the 11th century. In 1090 a new charter was granted to the old Buddhist sanctuary, it is the last known inscription with a reference to the Shailendras. With the absence of legitimate successor, Shailendra dynasty seems ceased to rule. Other family within Srivijaya mandala took over the throne, a new Maharaja named Sri Deva according to Chinese source establishing new dynasty to rule Srivijaya. He sent an embassy to the court of China in 1028 CE.

Shailendras in Bali
Sri Kesari Warmadewa was said to be a Buddhist king of the Shailendra Dynasty who led a military expedition to establish a Mahayana Buddhist government in Bali. In 914, he left a record of his endeavour in the Belanjong pillar in Sanur in Bali. According to this inscription, the Warmadewa dynasty was probably the branch of Shailendras that ruled Bali.

List of Shailendran rulers 
Traditionally, the Shailendra period was viewed to span from the 8th to the 9th century, confined only in Central Java, from the era of Panangkaran to Samaratungga. However the recent interpretation suggests the longer period of Shailendra family might existed, from mid 7th century (edict of Sojomerto inscription) to early 11th century (the fall of Shailendran dynasty of Srivijaya under Chola invasion). For certain period, Shailendras ruled both Central Java and Sumatra. Their alliance and intermarriage with Srivijayan ruling family resulted with the merging of two royal houses, with Shailendran finally emerge as the ruling family of both Srivijaya and Mataram (Central Java).

Some historians tried to reconstruct the order and list of Shailendra rulers, although there is some disagreement on the list. Boechari tried to reconstruct the early stage of Shailendra based on Sojomerto inscription, while other historians such as Slamet Muljana and Poerbatjaraka tried to reconstruct the list of Shailendran king in middle and later period with their connections to Sanjaya and Srivijaya, based on inscriptions and Carita Parahyangan manuscript. However, there is some confusion occurred, because the Shailendra seems to rule many kingdoms; Kalingga, Mataram and later Srivijaya. As the result name of the same kings often overlapped and seem to rule these kingdoms simultaneously. The questionmark (?) signify doubt or speculation because of the scarcity of available valid sources.

See also

 List of monarchs of Java
 Slendro
 Candi of Indonesia
 Indonesian Esoteric Buddhism

Notes

References
 De Casparis, J.G. de (1956). Prasasti Indonesia II : Selected inscriptions from the 7th to the 9th centuries AD. Bandung: Masu Baru, 1956

External links

 Borobudur website

 
Mataram Kingdom
Precolonial states of Indonesia
History of Java
Hindu dynasties
Hindu Buddhist states in Indonesia
Central Java
Borobudur
Deified people
Indonesian families
Former countries in Indonesian history